My Grandfather's People is a 2011 Turkish comedy-drama film directed by Çağan Irmak. It focuses on a Cretan grandfather who was forced to leave his home in Crete during the population exchange between Greece and Turkey, and who hopes to see his birthplace again before his death.

Cast 
 Çetin Tekindor - Mehmet Yavaş
 Hümeyra - Peruzat
 Zafer Algöz - Mayor
 Yiğit Özşener - İbrahim
 Gökçe Bahadır - Nurdan
 Mert Fırat - Hasan
 Ezgi Mola - Fatma

References

External links 

2011 comedy-drama films
2011 films
Turkish comedy-drama films
Films directed by Çağan Irmak
Films set in İzmir
Films shot in İzmir
Films shot in Crete
Warner Bros. films